The 1945 season was the Hawthorn Football Club's 21st season in the Victorian Football League and 44th overall.

Fixture

Premiership Season

Ladder

References

Hawthorn Football Club seasons